The U.S. unincorporated territory of American Samoa first required its residents to register their motor vehicles and display license plates in 1924.

American Samoa adopted these standards in 1977.

Baseplates

1927 to 1969

1970 to present

Non-passenger plates

References

External links
 Plateshack.com - American Samoa Y2K
 World License Plates - American Samoa

+American Samoa
American Samoa-related lists
Transportation in American Samoa